The Little Pipe Creek bridge and viaduct is a  continuous truss bridge with main span and 19 viaduct sections as well as an active railroad trestle crossing Little Pipe Creek south of Keymar, Maryland. Originally constructed by the Frederick and Pennsylvania Line Railroad Company (F&PL). Construction on the trestle began in late 1871, and continued until April 1872.

The Pennsylvania Railroad acquired control of the F&PL in 1896, and rebuilt the bridge that year as an open deck riveted iron plate under girder bridge and then again in 1902-1903 using steel in the bridge and trestle. In 1915, the bridge was surveyed as part of the Interstate Commerce Commission's effort to establish freight rates for the parent railroad. The United States Railroad Administration rebuilt the creek span circa 1917. Additional work rebuilding the bridge and trestle was performed from 1982 to 1989 by the Maryland State Railroad Administration. In 1991, the bridge was surveyed as part of the Maryland Historic Sites Inventory.

As of 2021, the bridge is in rail service, operated by the Maryland Midland Railway.

History

Construction

Bollman Iron Bridge
The original bridge was to be a Bollman Truss Railroad Bridge. The Little Pipe Creek bridge and viaduct structures were to be a mixture of wrought iron tension members and cast iron compression members, including other decorative elements, such as Doric styled vertical members and end towers, all cast iron and detailed. Bollman built about a hundred of these bridges through 1873 and this bridge with a creek span of 135 feet, 60 feet above water was one of the last and largest bridges built by Bollman using his patent.

In 1872, Bollman's firm, Patapsco Bridge and Iron Works completed the bridge and viaducts with a total length of 705 feet, span over little pipe creek of 135 feet, trestle consisting of 19 spans, eleven on the Frederick County side and eight on the Carroll County side of the creek.

Pennsylvania Railroad Rebuilds
In 1896, the Pennsylvania Railroad acquired control of the F&PL. The original Bollman iron truss span over Little Pipe Creek of 135 feet (Span 9 in the USRA drawing) was replaced with a steel plate under girder span of shorter length (79 feet). The immediately adjacent trestles (north and south) were also replaced with 42 foot steel trestles, leaving the rest of the original Bollman built iron trestle approaches intact.

In 1902-03, these remaining, original Bollman trestles from 1872 were replaced by McClintic Marshall and the Phoenix Company as follows: 
Approach spans 1 through 7, counting from the Frederick County or south end of the bridge, were built by McClintic Marshall in 1903.

Spans 11 through 15 were built from the north end by the Phoenix Bridge Company in 1902.

United States Railway Administration (USRA) Rebuild

In 1917, span 9, the Little Pipe Creek span was rebuilt using new materials with no information on the scope of the effort.

State Railroad Administration (1982-1989)
The Pennsylvania Railroad merged into the Penn Central in 1968. The latter company went bankrupt in 1970 and the assets were transferred to Conrail in 1976. Subsequent to the conveyance of the railroad from Conrail to the State of Maryland in 1982, the State Railroad Administration (SRA) developed a statewide Rail Plan. This plan called for the rebuild of the bridge-deck which SRA contracted for in 1987. In 1989, SRA contracted to rehabilitate the bridge by making further substructure and superstructure repairs as well as trackwork on the bridge approaches. Under its lease agreement with the State, the operating railroad replaced wooden cross ties on the bridge deck in 1980.

In 1991, the bridge was surveyed as part of the Maryland Historical Trust's Inventory of Historic Properties.

Maryland Midland Railway
In 2005, The State of Maryland sold the bridge to the Maryland Midland Railway.

Notes

References 

Bridges in Frederick County, Maryland
Bridges completed in 1872
Continuous truss bridges in the United States
Railroad bridges in Maryland
Viaducts in the United States
Pennsylvania Railroad bridges
Steel bridges in the United States
Trestle bridges in the United States
1872 establishments in Maryland